(Gayo) Hilary Chisonga was the Anglican Bishop of Masasi from 1969 until 1983.

References

Anglican bishops of Masasi
20th-century Anglican bishops in Tanzania